Bec Cola is a carbonated soft drink produced by Bec Soda Inc. in Montreal, Quebec, Canada. Sweetened primarily with maple syrup, it debuted in 2014; the company was founded by Olivier Dionne and brothers Gwendal and Kevin Creurer. The beverage is distributed by Horizon Nature and sold in Canada, France, Belgium, and Switzerland.

History

In 2012, Olivier Dionne (born ), a travel guide and former soul singer, and brothers Gwendal Creuer (born ) and Kevin Creuer (born ), a motion graphic designer and music teacher, respectively, decided to create a soda without using artificial ingredients, after seeing the amount of chemical additives in other colas. The founders have kept their previous jobs.

It took two years to develop a formula that tasted the same. The trio worked with professional chemists to replace the chemical additives in generic cola with natural ingredients. They also worked with the Federation of Quebec Maple Syrup Producers for a supply of maple syrup, which makes up 88% of the formula's sugar content; the rest is beet sugar, and a bottle contains 30 grams of sugar total.

Production

Bec Soda Inc. entered production in August 2014, with $140,000 of the partners' money invested. Two months after its launch, it began to be bottled in Rougemont, Quebec. In the first year, it sold 50,000 bottles. The company sold 500,000 bottles in the first half of 2016. Lime and cranberry variants were introduced in June 2016, and the 100,000-bottle production run was pre-sold. According to Dionne, the cola has received a generally positive public reaction.

Ingredients

 Filtered carbonated water
 Organic maple syrup
 Organic beet sugar
 Citric acid
 Organic caramel colour
 Organic cola flavour

Geographic spread

, company has 1,200 points of sale in Quebec and 1,000 points of sale combined in France, Belgium, and Switzerland. It is also sold in Ontario. The labeling, originally entirely in French, is also printed in English.

References

External links
 

Products introduced in 2014
Canadian drinks
Cola brands